The Turkvision Song Contest (TSC), also known as the Türkvizyon Song Contest, is a recurring song contest created by Turkish music channel TMB TV, inspired by the format of the Eurovision Song Contest. The first edition took place in Eskişehir, Turkey in December 2013. Countries and regions which were Turkic-speaking and of Turkic ethnicity are eligible to participate in the song contest. The contest was last held on 20 December 2020 as an online event hosted from Istanbul, Turkey.

History
Turkvision is a song contest which was created by TÜRKSOY in cooperation with the Turkish music channel TMB TV. Based on the similar format of the Eurovision Song Contest, Turkvision focuses primarily on participating Turkic countries and regions. The participating countries and regions had to take part in the Semi Final. A juror from each nation awarded between 1 and 10 points for every entry, except their own. An amount of 12 to 15 nations qualified for the Grand Final where the jury determined the winner. TÜRKSOY stated that televoting would be introduced in the future, but this never took place.

Hosting of the Turkvision Song Contest takes place in the country or region that also hosts the Turkic Capital of Culture.

In November 2020, the official Turkvision website posted that they hoped to stage the  edition in Shusha, Azerbaijan. This was confirmed in December 2020 by İslam Bağırov, the contest's general coordinator, though it was later revealed that the 2021 edition would be taking place in Turkistan, Kazakhstan. However, the 2021 contest did not materialize.

On 1 February 2022, the Uzbekistan Tourism Ambassador announced on Twitter that the 2022 contest would take place in the first week of June 2022 in Fergana, Uzbekistan. However, this did not materialize and TÜRKSOY stated that the contest will be moved to Bursa, Turkey and take place later in the year, but that didn't materialize either. As of now, the future of the Turkvision Song Contest remains uncertain.

Participation

Participants from Turkic-speaking and Turkic countries or regions were eligible to compete in the annual Turkvision Song Contests, such as Crimea, Karachay-Cherkessia, and Turkey.

There were several unsuccessful attempts to participate in the Turkvision Song Contest. Chuvashia, Russia, Turkmenistan, and Xinjiang were one of the original twenty-four participating areas with initial intentions to competing at the 2013 Contest, but later withdrew for undisclosed reasons.

Russia's Omsk Oblast broadcast the 2014 contest, but they have never made any statement regarding participation. A delegation from another Russian federal subject, Kalmykia, attended the 2015 contest, but did not participate and have not made any subsequent statements regarding participation.

Table key

Other countries
The following countries and regions had confirmed participation at previous editions of the contest, but either withdrew prior to their debut or the contest was cancelled before they could:
 Austria.
 Belgium.
 Chuvashia.
 Dagestan. On 1 July 2016, it was confirmed that Dagestan would make their official Turkvision Song Contest début at the 2016 contest to be held in Turkey, however the contest was eventually canceled.
 Greece.
 Hungary.
 Kumyk. On 23 September 2015 it was confirmed that the Kumyks would make their official début at the  contest to be held in Istanbul, Turkey. However, on 17 December it was announced that Kumyk would not debut at the contest due to the current state of international relations between the Russian Federation and Turkey. Despite this Kumyk did select Gulmira, Fatima and Kamilya with the song "Alğa!" to represent them in 2015. The Kumyks had selected Daniyal Harunow as their artist in  before the contest's cancellation.
 Latvia. On 29 October 2016, it was announced that Latvia would be making their Turkvision debut at the 2016 edition, and had internally selected Oksana Bilera with the song "Yakışıyor bize bu sevgi". However, it was later confirmed that both of the 2016 contests had been cancelled due to the December 2016 Istanbul bombings.
 Netherlands. In October 2016, it was announced that the Netherlands would debut at the 2016 contest in Turkey, when the song "Ana – Vətən", performed by Elcan Rzayev, was announced as the country's entry. However, the 2016 contest was later cancelled. The Netherlands' participation in the  contest was provisionally confirmed in November 2020, when "Ana – Vətən", performed by Elcan Rzayev, was again revealed as the Netherlands' entry for the contest. However, in December 2020, Rzayev withdrew from the contest due to COVID-19 restrictions in the Netherlands, leaving the country's participation in the contest in doubt.
 Russia
 Stavropol Krai. On 23 September 2015 it was confirmed that Nogais would make their official Turkvision Song Contest début at the 2015 contest to be held in Istanbul, Turkey. But later on 23 November it was announced that they will be represented as Stavropol Krai. However, the contest was eventually canceled. 
 Sweden. On 25 October 2016, it was announced that Sweden will debut at the 2016 contest in Turkey. The same day it was announced that Arghavan with the song "Dirçəliş" will fly the Swedish to Turkey. After initially opting to send their 2016 entry to the 2020 contest, the country eventually withdrew citing an inability to record a performance acceptable for the competition.
 Tajikistan.
 Xinjiang. Xinjiang was to make their debut at the inaugural 2013 festival, in Eskişehir, Turkey, however it later opted to not partake.

Winners

By year

By country/region

The table below shows the top-three placings from each contest, along with the years that a country won the contest.

By language

Hosting

See also 

 ABU Song Festivals
 Bala Turkvision Song Contest
 Bundesvision Song Contest
 Cân i Gymru
 Caribbean Song Festival
 Eurovision Choir of the Year
 Eurovision Dance Contest
 Eurovision Song Contest
 Eurovision Young Dancers
 Eurovision Young Musicians
 Intervision Song Contest
 Junior Eurovision Song Contest
 OGAE
 OGAE Second Chance Contest
 OGAE Video Contest
 Sopot International Song Festival

Notes and references

Footnotes

References

External links

 

 
Song contests
Recurring events established in 2013
2013 establishments in Turkey